Monksilver is a village  west of the town of Williton in Somerset, England, on the eastern flank of the Brendon Hills and the border of the Exmoor National Park. The Coleridge Way footpath passes through the village.

History
The name of the village means monk's wood. In the Domesday Book it was simply Selvre, from the Latin silva for a wood, although it has also been suggested that Sulfhere, in AD 897, referred to the silvery stream below the village.

In 1113 the manor was given by Robert de Chandos to endow Goldcliff Priory, which he had just established near Newport in Monmouthshire . In 1441 it passed, with the priory, to Tewkesbury Abbey and then in 1474 to the canons of Windsor. In the 14th century the name changed to "Monksilver".

The parish of Monksilver was part of the Williton and Freemanners Hundred. In the 16th and 17th centuries it was a centre for cloth making and field names such as "Rack", at nearby Woodford, suggest this activity.

Governance
The parish council has responsibility for local issues, including setting an annual precept (local rate) to cover the council's operating costs and producing annual accounts for public scrutiny. The parish council evaluates local planning applications and works with the local police, district council officers, and neighbourhood watch groups on matters of crime, security, and traffic. The parish council's role also includes initiating projects for the maintenance and repair of parish facilities, as well as consulting with the district council on the maintenance, repair, and improvement of highways, drainage, footpaths, public transport, and street cleaning. Conservation matters (including trees and listed buildings) and environmental issues are also the responsibility of the council.

The village falls within the non-metropolitan district of Somerset West and Taunton, which was established on 1 April 2019. It was previously in the district of West Somerset, which was formed on 1 April 1974 under the Local Government Act 1972, and part of Williton Rural District before that. The district council is responsible for local planning and building control, local roads, council housing, environmental health, markets and fairs, refuse collection and recycling, cemeteries and crematoria, leisure services, parks, and tourism.

Somerset County Council is responsible for running the largest and most expensive local services such as education, social services, libraries, main roads, public transport, policing and  fire services, trading standards, waste disposal and strategic planning.

The village lies within the Bridgwater and West Somerset county constituency represented in the House of Commons of the Parliament of the United Kingdom. The constituency elects one Member of Parliament (MP) by the first past the post system of election.

Religious sites

The parish church, dedicated to All Saints, has a square tower containing five bells. Inside is an Easter sepulchre. The pulpit is 16th-century, the screen is Jacobean and the lectern is possibly older. The wagon roof is thought to be 13th-century and an alms box by the door is from 1634. It has been designated by English Heritage as a Grade I listed building. In 1583 Sir Francis Drake married his second wife Elizabeth Sydenham, of nearby Combe Sydenham in the parish of Stogumber, at the church.

Amenities
The village has a village hall (shared with the parishes of Nettlecombe and Elworthy), a telephone box and a newspaper hut. The village pub, The Notley Arms, serves locally sourced food. The village is served twice a week with a bus service connecting it to Taunton. The mobile library visits every three weeks.

The village lies on the route of both the Coleridge Way and Samaritans Way South West.

References

External links

Villages in West Somerset
Civil parishes in Somerset